Sern or variant may refer to:

Science and technology
 SERN (single expansion ramp nozzle), a type of rocket nozzle
 "Sern.", the standard botanical abbreviation for botanist Rutger Sernander

In fiction
 SERN, a fictional organization, a fictionalized version of CERN, from the videogame Steins;Gate
 Sern, a fictional sector of space from Star Wars, see List of Star Wars Legends characters

Other uses
 sern, a raw fish dish in Chinese cuisine, see Iu Mien language

See also

 
 Cerne (disambiguation)
 Cern (disambiguation)

Disambiguation pages